Kollam Bypass is a part of NH 66 that bypasses CBD of Kollam city in Kerala, India. The busy 13.141 km long bypass starts at Mevaram in the south to Kavanad in the north, via Ayathil, Kallumthazham, Kadavoor and Kureepuzha in Kollam city. It is a joint venture between the central and state government. It was inaugurated on 15 January 2019 by Prime Minister Narendra Modi.

History
Government of Kerala had proposed Kollam bypass project in 1972. The then Public Works Department minister Mr. T. K. Divakaran was the man behind Kollam bypass project. The earlier plan was to construct a bypass road through Kollam city via Olayil, Thevally, Vellayittambalam. But T. K. Divakaran denied that proposal and asked to re-draw the plan through Mevaram. Ayathil, Kallumthazham, Kavanad route and then mooted the bypass plan as per the new route. Later in 1993, a stretch of 3 km from Mevaram to Ayathil was completed and 1.5 km Ayathil-Kallumthazham stretch was completed in 1999 and the remaining Kallumthazham-Kavanad stretch completed in 2019. This stretch includes three bridges, five culverts, one vehicle underpass, and five major intersections, and needs to pass over the Ashtamudi Lake. The road includes a seven-metre two-lane carriageway, paved shoulders and earthen shoulders.

The importance of the Kollam bypass is that it touches 3 major National Highways(NH 66(Formerly known as NH 47), NH 183 (Formerly known as NH 220), NH 744 (Formerly known as NH 208)) passing through the state of Kerala.

The two-lane Kollam Bypass road was inaugurated on 15 January by Prime Minister Narendra Modi. The road is witnessing heavy traffic congestion since its opening. In January 2019, the Government of Kerala and NHAI have decided to widen the road into 45 meters. As per the plan, Kollam Bypass would become a four-lane road with overbridges at Mevaram, Kavanad and underpassages at Ayathil, Kallumthazham and Kadavoor junctions.

Timeline

Project Details
 Length: 13.14 km
 Total Construction Cost: 
 Construction Mode: Engineering Procurement Construction(EPC)
 South End: Mevaram
 North End: Kavanad
 Major Bridges: 3 nos (Kadavoor, Neeravil, Kavanad)
 Underpass: 1 nos (Neeravil)*
 ROB: 1 nos (Kallumthazham)*
 No of Pilings: 190 nos
 Piers: 46 nos
 Culverts: 7 nos
*Included in the plan. Not yet started/completed

Junctions
 Kavanad (Towards Mumbai through NH 66)
 Kadavoor (Towards Theni through NH 183 )
 Kallumthazham (Towards Tirumangalam through NH 744)
 Ayathil (Towards Kulathupuzha through State Highway)
 Mevaram (Towards Trivandrum through NH 66)

Latest developments on bypass project

 18 bidders have qualified for the bypass tender process - April 2014
 Government of India and Government of Kerala have decided to share the cost of Kollam bypass project equally - May 2014
 National Highway Authority of India is planning to re-tender the work with a change in estimate cost.
 Government of India has granted approval for Kollam bypass, a joint venture of the State and the Central governments in January 2015.
 Chief Minister of Kerala Oommen Chandy signed an agreement with a private company on 11 February 2015 to complete the works within 30 months. The total cost for works would be Rs. 352 crore. The Government of Kerala has added the Kollam bypass project to its list of mega projects.
Cherian Varkey Construction Company(CVCC)-RDS is the contractor for the project. Same company is responsible for the execution of Alappuzha Bypass also. It was an EPC Contract for the construction of 2 Lane Bypass. 
 Preliminary works for Kollam bypass has been commenced again on 4 March 2015 after a long gap. Currently, clearing of the way for bypass is going on here. Re-aligning of telephone cables, water pipelines and KSEB feeder lines will commence soon as part of this work.
 Mr. Nitin Gadkari, Union Minister for Road Transport and Highways and Kerala Chief Minister Mr. Oommen Chandy have jointly inaugurated the third phase construction work of Kollam bypass on 10 April 2015. 

 26 November 2017 is the final deadline for the completion of Kollam Bypass. If the construction company fails to meet the deadline, a fine will be imposed on the company based on the delayed days.
 The construction work comes to a standstill due to the insufficiency of gravel. - October 2016
 In July 2017, Central Minister Pon Radhakrishnan announced that Kollam Bypass work would be completed only by August 2018 due to the scarcity of construction materials and soil to fill the land. Also, Kollam MP N. K. Premachandran announced that the bypass road will be commissioned in August 2018.
 Government of Kerala hopes to open Kollam Bypass by September 2018.
 Kollam bypass will be ready in a month. Street lights would be installed throughout the stretch. - 25 October 2018
 The inauguration of Kollam Bypass will be on 2 February 2019 by Pinarayi Vijayan, Chief Minister of Kerala. - 24 December 2018
 Prime Minister's office confirmed with Kollam MP N. K. Premachandran that Narendra Modi will inaugurate Kollam Bypass on 15 January 2019 - 9 January 2019
 Government of Kerala asked toll exemption to Central Ministry for Kollam bypass - 9 January 2019
 Union Minister Nitin Gadkari gave assurance to Kollam MP N. K. Premachandran regarding Kollam Bypass widening into four lane as a standalone project soon - 1 August 2020

Gallery

See also

 NH-66
 NH-744
 NH-183
 Kollam
 Transport in Kollam
 Downtown Kollam

References

NH bypasses in Kerala
66
Roads in Kollam
History of Kerala (1947–present)